Marusine is a village in Tulchyn Raion, Vinnytsia Oblast of Ukraine. As of 2010, there were 5 inhabitants. The village's postal code is 23608.

Tulchyn Raion

Villages in Tulchyn Raion